The Norwich Lanes, known locally as The Lanes, is an area of Norwich, a city in Norfolk, England. It consists of a series of mostly pedestrian-oriented small lanes, alleyways and streets. Norwich Lanes is noted for its independent retailers, and eating and drinking establishments. The area also contains some of the city's cultural attractions, including museums, theatres, pubs and bars. As part of a nationwide drive to recognise the importance of the character and individuality of Britain's high streets, and to maintain it,  Norwich Lanes won the Great British High Street Awards 2014 in the "City" category.

History

References 

Areas of Norwich
Conservation areas in England